Hotei may refer to:

Hotei Station, a Japanese train station
Tomoyasu Hotei, a Japanese musician
Budai, known as "Hotei" in Japanese, a semi-historical monk and deity
Coralliophila hotei, a species of sea snail
School Judgement: Gakkyu Hotei, a Japanese manga series